Randy Edwards is a former professional American football player who played defensive lineman for four seasons for the Seattle Seahawks.

References

1961 births
Living people
American football defensive ends
Seattle Seahawks players
Alabama Crimson Tide football players